Thann may refer to:

Places 
Austria
 Thann (Warth), in Warth, Lower Austria
 Thann (Opponitz), in Opponitz, Lower Austria
 Thann (Hargelsberg), in Hargelsberg, Upper Austria

France
 Thann, Haut-Rhin
 Canton of Thann, a former administrative unit

Other uses 
 Battle of Thann (1809), during the War of the Fifth Coalition

See also 
 Than (disambiguation)
 Tanne (disambiguation)